Abbasabad (also Romanized as ‘Abbāsābād and ‘Abāsābād; also known as ‘Abbāsābād-e Larnī) is a village in Jamalabad Rural District, Sharifabad District, Pakdasht County, Tehran Province, Iran. At the 2006 census, its population was 290, in 72 families.

References 

Populated places in Pakdasht County